The 2010–11 Drexel Dragons men's basketball team represented Drexel University during the 2010–11 NCAA Division I men's basketball season. The Dragons, led by 10th year head coach Bruiser Flint, played their home games at the Daskalakis Athletic Center and were members of the Colonial Athletic Association.

Roster

Schedule

|-
!colspan=8 style="background:#F8B800; color:#002663;"| Exhibition
|-

|-
!colspan=8 style="background:#F8B800; color:#002663;"| Regular season
|-

|-
!colspan=8 style="background:#F8B800; color:#002663;"| CAA tournament

Schedule source:

Rankings

Awards
Gerald Colds
CAA Player of the Week

Chris Fouch
CAA All-Conference Third Team

Samme Givens
CAA All-Conference Second Team

Frantz Massenat
CAA All-Rookie Team

Dartaye Ruffin
CAA All-Rookie Team
CAA Rookie of the Week (5)

References

Drexel Dragons men's basketball seasons
Drexel
Drexel
Drexel